Glenavon Football Club is a Northern Irish semi-professional football club that competes in the NIFL Premiership. Founded in 1889, the club hails from Lurgan and plays its home matches at Mourneview Park. Club colours are blue and white. Gary Hamilton has been player-manager of the Lurgan Blues since December 2011 following the resignation of Marty Quinn. Glenavon's bitter rivals are Portadown, with their matches known as the "Mid-Ulster Derby".

History
Glenavon was the first provincial club to win the Irish League title (1951–52) and also the first provincial club to do the league and cup double (1956–57). The latter triumph also made them the first Northern Irish team to enter the European Cup. The success of the 1950s is still the benchmark at the club – the closest the club have come to achieving a league success since came in the 1993–94 season, when but for two late goals in the final match Glenavon would have been crowned champions.

Glenavon enjoyed a good run throughout the 1990s, consistently achieving good placings in the league and winning several cup competitions, including Irish Cup wins in 1991–92 and 1996–97, and were runners-up against Glentoran in the 1995–96 and 1997–98 editions of the cup. The club then suffered a relatively poor spell during the early 2000s, which culminated in relegation to the second tier in the 2003–04 Irish League season. Although they were promoted the following season, Glenavon continued to struggle towards the bottom of the league throughout the remainder of the decade, going through several managers such as Terry Cochrane, Stephen McBride & Marty Quinn. McBride was a Northern Ireland international and a popular Glenavon player in the 1980s & 1990s, but his reign lasted just seven months before he was relieved of his managerial duties with Glenavon at the bottom of the IFA Premiership.

Former Portadown & Glentoran forward Gary Hamilton was appointed player-manager in December 2011, managing to steer the club from relegation in the remainder of the 2011–12 Irish League season. This was followed up by a 9th-place finish in the 2012–13 season. The 2013–14 season was welcomed by many as a successful season, the Lurgan club securing a top-six league finish and a return to winning major silverware with the 2013–14 Irish Cup, in which Glenavon triumphed 2–1 over Ballymena United in the final.

Following on from this cup triumph was a successful 2014–15 season. Though Glenavon did not fare as well in the Irish Cup, exiting at the 6th round to Championship 1 side Harland & Wolff Welders, an excellent late run of 7 consecutive wins saw the Lurgan Blues pip their Mid-Ulster rivals Portadown to a third-placed league finish, therefore sealing European football for the 2015–16 season.

The 2015–16 season would be another good season for the Lurgan Blues, once again securing Europe on the penultimate matchday by finishing third, on a points total of 69. Even more success was to follow, as the club claimed a second Irish Cup win in three years, defeating David Healy's Linfield 2–0 in the final.

Glenavon did not enjoy similar success in the 2016–17 season. Despite having signed former Celtic and Northern Ireland winger Paddy McCourt, the club struggled for form and could only achieve a disappointing 6th-placed finish in the league. Although the club reached the semi-finals of the Mid-Ulster Cup, League Cup and Irish Cup, they were defeated in all by Warrenpoint Town, Carrick Rangers and Coleraine respectively. Glenavon also suffered agonising defeat to Ballymena United in the Europa League playoff final, therefore missing out on a fourth successive year of European qualification.

Despite failure to qualify for Europe and a large exodus of players at the start of the 2017–18 season, the signing of players such as Sammy Clingan and Andrew Mitchell, aligned with the emergence of Bobby Burns, meant that Glenavon had a resurgence in form, finishing third once again, and qualifying for Europe. However, the only piece of silverware attained was the Mid-Ulster Cup, having exited the League Cup and Irish Cup via shock defeats at the hands of Ards and Loughgall.

While the 2018–19 season yielded a club-record points total of 70, the club had a disappointing record in the major cups, falling to defeat against Dergview and Dungannon Swifts in the League Cup and Irish Cup respectively. However, the Lurgan Blues did retain the Mid-Ulster Cup with a 4–3 victory over Warrenpoint Town. Despite attaining another third-place finish, Glenavon fell to a 2–4 defeat against Glentoran in the Europa League playoff semi-final and failed to attain European qualification for the following season.

The club endured a difficult 2019–20 campaign, falling to several heavy defeats in the league and exiting the Irish Cup at the 5th round with a 2–0 defeat against Coleraine. Inconsistent form meant that the club finished outside of the league's top-six for the first time since the 2012–13 season.

The Lurgan Blues' form improved significantly in the 2020–21 season, but the club narrowly missed out on a top-six finish; their final points total of 62 was the highest points tally recorded for a team in the bottom-six. Their seventh-place finish secured the Lurgan Blues a spot in the Europa Conference League playoffs. They faced Larne in the semi-final, losing narrowly to a Martin Donnelly goal in injury time, leaving Glenavon without European qualification.

The 2021–22 season saw the unexpected departure of the previous season's top scorer, Danny Purkis, but Glenavon would once again claim a seventh-place finish and qualification for the Europa Conference League playoffs. They were defeated at the semi-final stage, losing 2-0 against third-placed Glentoran at The Oval. The same opposition had eliminated Glenavon in the NIFL League Cup earlier in the season. The Lurgan Blues exited the Irish Cup in controversial fashion, having had two goals disallowed against Crusaders.

Stadium

Since 1895, Glenavon's home stadium has been Mourneview Park, located in the south of Lurgan.

From 1992 to 2011, significant alterations were made to Mourneview Park in order to bring the ground up to a modern standard. Along the side of the pitch runs the Geddis Stand (holds roughly 1700), and on the other side the Glenfield Road Stand (holds roughly 2000), which houses away supporters. Behind one of the goals, the ground has the Crescent End (400 seats, and standing area), and at the other end the Hospital End contains a training pitch.

In addition to Glenavon's home matches, the stadium is also a regular host for Northern Ireland under-21 matches, and was the venue for several group stage games in the UEFA Women's Under-19 Euro 2017 finals. Due to the ongoing renovation of Windsor Park, Mourneview Park was chosen as the venue for Linfield's home ties in the 2014–15 UEFA Europa League. The stadium has occasionally been used as a neutral ground for Irish Cup semi-finals, most recently in the 2018–19, 2020–21, and 2021–22 editions of the competition.

In September 2020, Glenavon FC unveiled a new 5m x 2m Digital LED Screen at Mourneview Park, which was supplied by FSL Scoreboards. It is the first of its kind anywhere in Ireland.

On 12 April 2021, it was announced that Mourneview Park would be the host venue for the 2020–21 Irish Cup Final; the first time the final has been staged outside of Belfast since 1975.

Mourneview Park hosted the second leg of the first round tie in the inaugural edition of the Europa Conference League between FK Velež Mostar and Coleraine F.C. on 15 July 2021, due to pitch redevelopments at The Showgrounds.

European record

Glenavon was the first Northern Irish team to enter the European Cup. In their first tie they drew AGF of Denmark, drawing 0–0 at home and losing 0–3 away.

Glenavon achieved some more notable results in Europe in the 1990s. In the 1992–93 season, they drew both legs of their Cup Winners Cup tie with Royal Antwerp and lost on penalties. In 1995–96 they reached the first round proper of the UEFA Cup (the last Irish League club to do so), and were beaten by Werder Bremen.

Overview

Matches

UEFA ranking

Current squad

Non-playing staff

Academy
Glenavon's Academy consists of teams at Under 7, Under 8, Under 9, Under 10, Under 11, Under 12, Under 13, Under 14, Under 15, Under 16 and Under 18. There is also an Under 20 development team which comes under the auspices of the Senior Club and plays as Glenavon Reserves.

The Academy was formed in 2007 as a result of the Irish league licensing requirements and then first team manager Colin Malone appointed Gordon Wylie as Academy co-ordinator. Gordon's first task was to bring ex Glenavon legend Stephen McBride back to the club as the Academy head coach.

The Glenavon Academy is now headed by Chris Chambers after previously being led by Alex Denver, Thomas McStravick and Ryan Prentice. The Academy currently has a number of UEFA A Licence and UEFA B Licence coaches.

In recent times the club has introduced various coaching programmes and training camps aimed at increasing the numbers within the Academy. These have included the Glenavon Academy Club Affiliation Programme, Schools Programme, Aces, Girls Football and annual Football Camps at Easter, Summer and Halloween.

Managerial history

 Harry Walker (1950–54)
 Jimmy McAlinden (1954–68)
 Ted Smyth (1968)
 Joe Kinkead (1968–69)
 Jimmy Jones (1969–72)
 Eric Adair (1972–73)
 Brian Campbell (1974–75)
 Alan Campbell (1975–78)
 Billy McClatchey (1978–79)
 Billy Sinclair (1979–82)
 Terry Nicholson (1982–91)
 Alan Fraser (1991–94)
 Nigel Best (1994–98)
 Billy Hamilton (1998)
 Roy Walker (1998–00)
 Colin Malone (2000–03)
 Alfie Wylie (2003–04)
 Tommy Kincaid (2004–05)
 Jimmy Brown (2005–06)
 Colin Malone (2006–07)
 Terry Cochrane (2008)
 Stephen McBride (2008–09)
 Marty Quinn (2009–11)
 Gary Hamilton (2011–)

Honours

Senior honours
Irish League: 3
1951–52, 1956–57, 1959–60
Irish Cup: 7
1956–57, 1958–59, 1960–61, 1991–92, 1996–97, 2013–14, 2015–16
Northern Ireland Football League Cup: 1
1989–90
City Cup: 5
1920–21, 1954–55, 1955–56, 1960–61, 1965–66
Gold Cup: 4
1954–55, 1956–57, 1990–91, 1997–98
Ulster Cup: 3
1954–55, 1958–59, 1962–63
Floodlit Cup: 2
1988–89, 1996–97
County Antrim Shield: 2
1990–91, 1995–96
Mid-Ulster Cup: 27
1897–98, 1901–02, 1904–05, 1906–07, 1908–09, 1910–11, 1924–25, 1925–26, 1930–31, 1932–33, 1937–38, 1947–48†, 1957–58†, 1965–66†, 1971–72†, 1976–77†, 1983–84, 1985–86, 1988–89, 1990–91, 1998–99, 2004–05, 2009–10, 2010–11, 2017–18, 2018–19, 2020–21
North-South Cup: 1
1962–63
Charity Shield: 2
1992 (shared), 2016

† Won by Glenavon Reserves

Intermediate honours
Irish Intermediate Cup: 3
1907–08, 1910–11, 2004–05
George Wilson Cup: 1
1963–64†
Bob Radcliffe Cup: 1
1990–91†

† Won by Glenavon Reserves

Junior honours
Irish Junior League: 2
1907–08, 1910–11
Irish Junior Cup: 1
1897–98
Beattie Cup: 1
1929–30†

† Won by Glenavon Reserves

Notes

References

External links
 Glenavon FC Website
 Glenavon FC Academy Website
 Glenavon Statistics and Results at the Irish Football Club Project

 
Association football clubs in Northern Ireland
Association football clubs established in 1889
NIFL Premiership clubs
Association football clubs in County Armagh
1889 establishments in Ireland
Lurgan